Melhania burchellii is a plant in the family Malvaceae, native to southern Africa. It is named for the English explorer and naturalist William John Burchell.

Description
Inflorescences are usually two to many-flowered, featuring yellow petals.

Distribution and habitat
Melhania burchellii is native to Botswana, Namibia, South Africa (Cape Provinces, Free State, Northern Provinces) and Zimbabwe. Its habitat is in dry areas.

References

burchellii
Flora of Southern Africa
Flora of Zimbabwe
Taxa named by Augustin Pyramus de Candolle